Adapter protein CIKS is a protein that in humans is encoded by the TRAF3IP2 gene.

This gene encodes a protein involved in regulating responses to cytokines by members of the Rel/NF-kappaB transcription factor family. These factors play a central role in innate immunity in response to pathogens, inflammatory signals and stress. This gene product interacts with TRAF proteins (tumor necrosis factor receptor-associated factors) and either I-kappaB kinase or MAP kinase to activate either NF-kappaB or Jun kinase. Two alternative transcripts encoding different proteins have been identified. A third transcript, which does not encode a protein and is transcribed in the opposite orientation, has been identified. Overexpression of this transcript has been shown to reduce expression of at least one of the protein encoding transcripts, suggesting it has a regulatory role in the expression of this gene.

Cellular function
TRAF3IP2 is the key activator of Th17-mediated inflammatory responses but also suppresses the humoral B cell response by negatively regulating CD40L and BAFF signaling. TRAF3IP2 seems to be more specific to Brucella infections than other Gram-negative bacteria. In the study of Degos et al., TRAF3IP2 expression was increased fourfold in human blood DCs after exposure to the Brucella virulence factor CβG (β-1,2 cyclic glucan) compared to the E. coli lipopolysaccharides (LPS) CβG is a highly abundant virulence factor of Brucella that modulates membrane rafts of the infected cell necessary for the intracellular escape (Arellano-Reynoso et al., 2005). It is thus one of the most Brucella-specific toxins recognized by immune cells. LPS is another important Gram-negative virulence factor. However, it is altered in Brucella, so it is only weakly immunostimulatory. Also, TRAF3IP2 and Th2-LCR lncRNA expression was particularly increased in the acute phase of brucellosis. During relapse phase of brucellosis, TRAF3IP2 expression seemed to decrease, whereas the Th2-LCR lncRNA level remained high.

Interactions 

TRAF3IP2 has been shown to interact with IKBKG.

References

Further reading